Carl'Alberto Perroux (also Carlo Alberto; 20 November 1905 – 20 August 1977), was an Italian contract bridge official, the founder and long-time non-playing captain of the Blue Team, the most successful team in bridge history. As Blue Team captain he won 8 Bermuda Bowls, 1 World Team Olympiad and 3 European Bridge League s championships in the period from 1951 to 1966.

Perroux was born in Mirandola, Modena, in 1905, the son of Alberto Perroux and Enrica Maramotti Perroux. A criminal attorney in private life, he was the captain of the team through 1950s and early 1960s. He was the main craftsman of the team's cohesion and spirit, both by supporting and consoling, and by exhorting and forcing. He was known for imposing tough discipline: players who broke the rules were unconditionally benched, regardless of short-term benefits. He even checked whether the team members went to bed alone and on time during tournaments.

Perroux was the president of Italian Bridge Federation from 1952 to 1967, when he retired to Brazil and began helping Brazilian players.

He wrote one book, The Blue Team – Our Story of Bridge, whose revised and enlarged edition was published in 1973.

Books

References

External links
 
 
 Carl Alberto Perroux at bridgeFILES (bridgefiles.net) – photos with text from The Official Encyclopedia of Bridge (unknown edition)

1905 births
1977 deaths
Italian contract bridge players
Contract bridge administrators
Contract bridge writers
Place of death missing
People from Mirandola